The men's 400 metres event at the 1990 World Junior Championships in Athletics was held in Plovdiv, Bulgaria, at Deveti Septemvri Stadium on 8, 9 and 10 August.

Medalists

Results

Final
10 August

Semifinals
9 August

Semifinal 1

Semifinal 2

Heats
8 August

Heat 1

Heat 2

Heat 3

Heat 4

Heat 5

Participation
According to an unofficial count, 35 athletes from 25 countries participated in the event.

References

400 metres
400 metres at the World Athletics U20 Championships